Mount Arayat is a potentially active stratovolcano sleeping in the
The volcano has a breached crater on its northwest side with a smaller andesitic dome in the collapse amphitheater. There are no historical records of eruption in Arayat and the only dated rocks are 530- and 650-thousand-year-old basalts predating the collapse and formation of the lava dome. However, weak steaming is currently present in some of the heavily eroded vents on the North Western side of the summit. Additionally an analysis report indicates that the volcano erupted over the last 2,000 years, but it is believed to refer to the volcanic activity of the volcano. The Mount Arayat National Park was established in 1933.

The southern half of the mountain lies within the municipality of Arayat, Pampanga, while the north half and the mountain summit lies within Magalang, Pampanga.  to the west of Mount Arayat is Angeles City and the former Clark Air Base. The volcano was officially declared as a tourist spot on 1997.

The mountain is mystical, the legendary home of Aung/Aring Sinukuan/Sinkuan/Suku or the Fairy known as diwata Maria Sinukuan depending on which version of the story the readers or listeners prefer, but in ancient Kapampangan folklore as well as the research gathered by Kapampangan students of Henry Otley Beyer, it was and is the abode of Apung/Aring Sinukuan, rival of Namalyari of Mount Pinatubo, who is in varying versions, the son of Cargon-Cargon who was mortally wounded in a fight with a giant from the Zambales Mountain Range which is said to be the home of Apu Namalyari. The mountain is currently under an immense deforestation threat. Locals have cited that there is a man in the mountain, angry due to the deforestation that was happening. Others say that it was Aring Sinukuan.

Etymology
The first mention of the origin of Arayat is a travel diary from 1696 by Gemelli Careri. The author mentions that according to the natives, the original name of the mountain is Bondo Kalaya, which later became Bondoc Alaya (literally "Mount Alaya"). Later on, Alaya became Arayat.

History

Philippine Revolution 
During the Philippine Revolution, the Filipino revolutionaries retreated on Mount Arayat after the failure of the Cry of Nueva Ecija during September 1896 when the Spanish counter-attacked at San Isidro.

In September 1897, Gen. Francisco Macabulos retreated to Mount Arayat along with his men to avoid capture by the Spanish authorities in Tarlac, which used to be under the control of his forces. Several engagements would occur here afterwards until his surrender on January 15, 1898.

World War II 
On Mount Arayat, Colonel Thorpe, an American guerrilla officer, was captured by Japanese forces on December 10, 1942.

Mount Arayat would then be used as a hiding place for communist Filipino guerrillas called the Hukbalahap afterwards.Nicanor Songco "Bapa"developed a plan on how they could spread the information of their escape to Mount Arayat to be safe in the height of the war. This plan would be the reason for the survival of their family from Bulacan, Pampanga and Nueva Ecija who joined them at that time. When they found out that the Japanese soldiers had arrived at their place, they quickly left and went to Mount Arayat but when they were about to go up, the officers of the Japanese soldiers came to arrest him. Nicanor surrendered to ensure everyone's safety. He was tortured by having his skin removed from his arm. Following this, he was released by the Japanese soldiers and he was able to return to Mount Arayat and his family.

Geography

Mount Arayat stands in the middle of the flat Central Luzon Plain, consisting of rice paddies and a typical elevation of about 15 to 35 metres MSL. This has resulted in a breached crater which opens in a west-northwest direction. This area is the apparent source of a major debris-avalanche deposit that forms hummocky terrain beyond the west and northwest sides of the volcano. The  summit stands on the northeast side of the breached crater, known as North Peak, while the  Pinnacle Peak is located on the southeast crater rim. Post-collapse activity formed an andesitic lava dome known as White Rock in the collapse amphitheater.

Eruptions
There are no cultural records of historical eruptions. However, weak steaming is currently present in some of the heavily eroded vents on the North Western side of the summit. The ancient eruptions were said to have caused the formation of a Lava Dome on the Western Slopes of the mountain known as White Rock which makes a nice tourist destination and is usually a field trip destination for students of Pampanga State Agricultural University. The Arayat amphitheatre is said to have been caused by the summit's collapse on the western side but a much deeper crater is present on the eastern side, it was said that the mountain was once a volcanic island, until eruptions covered the surrounding area with soil, eruptions were said to be the possible cause of a theorized re-route of Pampanga River which is said to have once passed on the western side rather than eastern side where it currently moves.

Geology

Rock types are basalt and andesite. The only rocks reported to have been dated are 0.53 and 0.65 million-year-old basalts. These predate the crater collapse and formation of the lava dome known as White Rock, which could have occurred in the last 2000 years.
The mountain which is believed to be several peaks merged at the top by some local people is actually a Single-Cone Stratovolcano.

Hiking activity

Two trails lead to the peaks of Mount Arayat. Mount Arayat National Park Located at San Juan Baño in Arayat, Pampanga has a trail to the southern Peak, taking around 3–4 hours to reach the peak. The Southern Peak offers views of Central Luzon, including a view of Pampanga River. The collapsed western Slope that forms the other half of its caldera-like crater can also be seen. It offers a view of the mountains of Zambales and Bataan (to the west), and the mountains of the Sierra Madre range (to the east). The northern or higher Peak can be accessed on a route from Pampanga State Agricultural University in Magalang, Pampanga, taking a similar time to reach the peak, however, this route takes you through the Arayat Amphitheatre and the so-called White Rock which legend claims to be the Home of Apung/Aring Sinukuan. There are two other trails on Mount Arayat's slopes as of 2017: the Pinnacle, which is a knife edge monkey trail, and the TKO, which is the hardest trail. The trails in San Juan Banyo, Arayat Pampanga. However, these two features, the Pinnacle and TKO, cannot be considered peaks because they are not prominent unlike the North and South peak, and thus are only considered as view decks as per International Mountaineering definitions.

Arayat in Folklore
The Mountain is said to be the home of the god/sorcerer named Sinukuan/Sinukwan or Sucu, which could mean "The end" or "he to whom others have surrendered." The mountain was said to have been located in the swamp to its south but relocated because of the evil ways of those who lived there, in addition to which, the people of the swamp were made to suffer numerous misfortunes. Sinukuan is believed to be able to transform and do as he pleases at will, his only real rival being Namalyari of Mount Pinatubo. The waterfalls at Ayala in Magalang, Pampanga is said to be his bathing quarters, and it is often visited by tourists and natives alike. Sinukuan is said to live at the White rock, a Lava dome possibly formed by the last eruption, where its glimmering properties were most likely to have inspired the legend. Contrary to reality, the mountain is believed to be several mountains merging at the center including the tallest two peaks. Sinukuan is believed to have daughters who come down only during time of grace and are disguised as humans, Sinukuan himself can be disguised as human. The day he comes back is believed to either be when he responds to the attack of Namalyari on Mount Pinatubo's 1991 eruption or when the time to call his servants upon the end of the world has come.

Prior to Spanish colonization, Sinukuan was known as a powerful male Kapampangan god, named Aring Sinukûan, who was in par with the Kapampangan god of Pinatubo, Apûng Malyari. The two were the second most powerful deities in Kapampangan mythology, next only to Mangechay (sometimes called Mangacha), the great elder and creator goddess. Aring Sinukûan was the sun god of war and death, taught the early inhabitants the industry of metallurgy, wood cutting, rice culture and waging war. He had three children, namely, Munag Sumalâ, the golden serpent god who represent dawn, Lakandanup, the god of gluttony who represented the sun at noon time, and Gatpanapun, the noble god who only knew pleasure and represented the afternoon. He also had a winged assistant named Galurâ, a giant eagle deity believed to be the bringer of storms, and a wife named Mingan. However, when the Spanish arrived, they 'rebranded' Sinukuan as a woman, thinking that the people would not revere the deity if he was a female, not knowing that the great elder deity of the Kapampangan was a woman named Mangechay. Despite this, the natives continued to revere Sinukuan. Furious, the Spanish added 'Maria' to Sinukuan's name to somewhat turn her into Catholic in a bid to further subjugate the natives and convert them into Roman Catholicism. In recent years, locals have cited that there is a man in the mountain, angry due to the deforestation that was happening. Others say that it was Aring Sinukuan.

Listings

Fumarole activity is reported on the NW side of the summit.

The Global Volcanism Program lists Mount Arayat as Holocene

Philippine Institute of Volcanology and Seismology (PHIVOLCS), list Mount Arayat as Potentially active volcano.

Conservation efforts
In April 2022, President Rodrigo Duterte signed a law declaring Mount Arayat as a protected landscape under the National Integrated Protected Areas System.

See also
List of active volcanoes in the Philippines
List of potentially active volcanoes in the Philippines
List of inactive volcanoes in the Philippines
List of national parks of the Philippines
Pacific ring of fire
Philippine Institute of Volcanology and Seismology

References

External links

 Mt. Arayat/ Arayat Trail (1,030+) on Pinoy Mountaineer

National parks of the Philippines
Arayat, Mount
Arayat, Mount
Arayat, Mount
Arayat, Mount
Arayat, Mount
Landforms of Pampanga
Tourist attractions in Pampanga
Arayat, Mount